Jean Mouchel (22 May 1928 – 7 March 2022) was a French politician, novelist, and farmer.

Life and career
Mouchel spent his childhood in Lieusaint, Manche, and subsequently became a farmer in Folligny and Noyers-Bocage. He became active in trade unions, serving as President of the Fédération régionale des syndicats d'exploitants agricoles and vice-president of the Fédération nationale des syndicats d'exploitants agricoles.

Mouchel's activism in trade unions led him to politics. In 1982, he was elected to represent France in the European Parliament as a member of the Rally for the Republic. He was re-elected in 1984.

Jean Mouchel died on 7 March 2022, at the age of 93.

Works
Le Champ de la bien-aimée (1988)
Les Cahiers de guerre de Jeanne Métadier (2002)
La Robe bleue d'Hélène (2002)
Le Fils d'Hélène (2005)
Soir maudit à la ferme d'Arry (2009)
Normands depuis toujours (2012)
La Bonne Fortune de Sébastien (2013)
Paysan engagé (2016)

References

1928 births
2022 deaths
20th-century French writers
21st-century French writers
People from Manche
French novelists
Writers from Normandy
Rally for the Republic politicians
MEPs for France 1979–1984
MEPs for France 1984–1989